The Liga Moçambicana de Basquetebol (LMB), known as the Liga Mozal for sponsorship reasons, is the highest basketball league in Mozambique. Founded in 1960, the league typically consists of eight teams. The winners of the competition earn the right to play in the qualifying tournaments of the Basketball Africa League (BAL).

Maxaquene is the most successful team in league history with 18 titles. In recent years, Ferroviário da Beira and Ferroviário de Maputo have dominated the league, with one of these two teams winning all championships since 2011.

Teams

Current teams 
The following were the eight teams of the 2022 season:

Former teams

Champions
The following were the champions, runners-up and third place teams in the Mozambican League history:

Performance by club 

Teams in bold currently play in the LMB.

Awards

Most Valuable Player

In the Basketball Africa League

References

Notes

External links
AfroBasket.com League Page

Basketball competitions in Mozambique
Basketball leagues in Africa
Sports leagues in Mozambique
1960 establishments in Mozambique
Sports leagues established in 1960